Alfonso Pecoraro Scanio (born 13 March 1959) is an Italian politician, lawyer and journalist. He served as Minister of Agriculture in the second cabinet of Giuliano Amato and as Minister of Environment in the second cabinet of Romano Prodi.

Born in Salerno, member of the Italian Chamber of Deputies since 1992, Pecoraro Scanio was the leader of the Federation of the Greens, one of the parties making up the ruling coalition in the new Italian government. He also served as Minister for Agriculture from 2000 to 2001 in the cabinet of Giuliano Amato. He was also one of the candidates as leader of L'Unione for the primary election held on 16 October 2005, finishing in fifth place with 2.2% of national votes.

Pecoraro Scanio has been accused of populistic and opportunistic behaviour for his position on the major waste disposal problem in Naples, which is part of his electoral region.

Pecoraro Scanio is openly bisexual. He has a younger brother, Marco Pecoraro Scanio, who is a former Serie A footballer with such clubs as Inter Milan, Salernitana and Ancona 1905. Marco is also a senator for the Green Party, elected in the 2006 election.

He is now President of the UniVerde Foundation and teaches at both the University of Milan Bicocca and the Tor Vergata University of Rome.

References

External links

1959 births
Bisexual men
Bisexual politicians
Living people
People from Salerno
Academic staff of the University of Rome Tor Vergata
Federation of the Greens politicians
Agriculture ministers of Italy
Environment ministers of Italy
LGBT legislators in Italy
21st-century LGBT people